A list of Singaporean films released in Singapore in 2014:

References

2014
Films
Singapore